A tanjung is a cape, and it is an extremely common geographical name in the Malay world.  It may refer to:

 George Town, Penang in the Malay language
 Tanjung, Tabalong, the capital city of Tabalong Regency, in South Kalimantan province of Indonesia
 Tanjung, Lombok, the capital city of North Lombok Regency, in West Nusa Tenggara province of Indonesia
 Tanja sail or Tanjung, another name for the Austronesian tilted square sail

See also
 Tanjong (disambiguation)